William "Bill" Edward Kelly III was the Republican candidate for Michigan House of Representatives in the 49th district  in 2006.  He suffered a defeat at the hands of incumbent Lee Gonzales (D-Flint). Final total was Kelly 24.6%, Gonzales 74.9%.

In April 2007, Kelly announced his intention to run for US House of Representatives - Michigan's 5th district against Dale Kildee (D-Flint).  He has since been identified as an important player in Michigan Republican presidential politics after changing his presidential endorsement of US Senator John McCain to former Massachusetts Governor Mitt Romney.  Kelly dropped out in his bid for congress, deciding instead to focus on his professional career.

Bill Kelly was elected at the February 2007 Michigan Republican State Convention to serve a two-year term as a member of the elite Michigan Republican State Committee where he represented the concerns of working-class Republicans.  He has held a variety of leadership positions with the College Republicans, Young Republicans, and state Michigan Republican Party as well as a statutory member of the Genesee County Republican Party.  Bill was elected treasurer of the Michigan Republican Party's 5th district in 2003. He has also served as a Genesee County delegate, State delegate, and precinct delegate.

Kelly has a Bachelor of Business Administration in accounting from the University of Michigan - Flint.  While attending The University of Michigan-Flint, he was a contributor to the student newspaper,  The Michigan Times .  Kelly is a graduate of the Western Michigan University's Haworth College of Business' Masters of Business Administration program, where he served as a representative of the Graduate Students Advisory Committee (GSAC) as well as a senator in the Western Students Association (WSA).  As of 2022, he lives in Lansing, Michigan with his wife (married in 2013 in Las Vegas, Nevada) and two sons (Vincent and Roman).

References

External links
 Campaign site

Year of birth missing (living people)
Michigan Republicans
Living people
College Republicans
University of Michigan–Flint alumni
Western Michigan University alumni